David Hu may refer to 
David Hu (IIG), IIG cofounder sentenced to 12 years in prison for fraud
David Hu (scientist), studied animal urination and defecation